Trichapus is a genus of beetles in the family Ciidae, containing the following species:

 Trichapus glaber Friedenreich, 1881
 Trichapus pubescens Friedenreich, 1881

References

Ciidae genera